Human rights in Senegal are generally better respected than in other countries in the continent, but cases of violation are still regularly reported.

History

The death penalty was abolished in 2004.

LGBT rights in Senegal

See also

Linked articles
Gender equality in Senegal
Media of Senegal
List of newspapers in Senegal
Politics of Senegal
Casamance conflict

Bibliography
 Kafui Ayaba Sandra Afanou, Der Menschenrechtsschutz in drei ausgewählten frankophonen Staaten Afrikas : Togo, Senegal und Kamerun, Frankfurt-sur-le-Main, Berlin, Berne, Brussels, New York, Oxford and Vienna, Lang, 2005, 228 p. (after a thesis at the University of Heidelberg, 2002) 
 James T. Lawrence (editor), Human rights in Africa Hauppauge, N.Y., Nova Science, 2004, 252 p. 
 Sidiki Kaba, Les droits de l'homme au Sénégal, Collection Xaam saa yoon, 1997, 547 p.
 Comité interministériel chargé des droits de l'homme, Le Sénégal face aux allégations de violation des droits de l'homme, 1996, 26 p.

External links
 Rapport 2007 d'Amnesty International : le Sénégal
 « Respect des droits de l'homme, des principes démocratiques et de l'État de droit - L'Union européenne prête à injecter jusqu'à 300 millions par projet » (article in Wal Fadjri, 11 May 2007)
 « Seydi Gassama, Directeur d'Amnesty International, "la situation des droits de l'homme au Sénégal a beaucoup régressé" » (article in Wal Fadjri, 24 May 2007)